The J Award of 2007 is the third annual J Awards, established by the Australian Broadcasting Corporation's youth-focused radio station Triple J. The announcement comes at the culmination of Ausmusic Month (November).
In 2007, a new award for Unearthed Artist of the Year was added to the award for Australian Album of the Year.

Who's eligible? 
Any Australian album released independently or through a record company, or sent to Triple J in consideration for airplay, is eligible for the J Award. The 2007 nominations for Australian Album of the Year were selected from albums received by Triple J between December 2006 and November 2007. For Unearthed Artist of the Year it was open to any artist from the Unearthed (talent contest), who has had a ground breaking and impactful 12 months from November 2006 and October 2007

Judging Panel 
The J Award judging panel is headed by Triple J's Music Director Richard Kingsmill. The panel includes Caroline Tran from Triple J's flagship Australian music program Home and Hosed and other Triple J presenters, producers and live music engineers.

Awards

Australian Album of the Year

Unearthed Artist of the Year

References

2007 in Australian music
2007 music awards
J Awards